Kozhikombu is a small village in Kottayam  district, Kerala, India. It is situated 3 km away from the Pala town.

Religious places
 Nithya Sahaya Matha Church is 0.5 km away.
 St. Francis Assisi Church is 1 km away.

References

Villages in Kottayam district